Migliaro is a frazione of the comune (municipality) of Fiscaglia in the Province of Ferrara in the Italian region Emilia-Romagna, located about  northeast of Bologna and about  east of Ferrara.  It was a separate comune until 2014.

References

 

 

Cities and towns in Emilia-Romagna